1731 Smuts, provisional designation , is a carbonaceous asteroid from the outer region of the asteroid belt, approximately 54 kilometers in diameter. It was discovered on 9 August 1948, by South African astronomer Ernest Johnson at Johannesburg Observatory in South Africa, who named it after Field marshal Jan Smuts.

Classification and orbit 

Smuts orbits the Sun in the outer main-belt at a distance of 2.8–3.6 AU once every 5 years and 8 months (2,060 days). Its orbit has an eccentricity of 0.13 and an inclination of 6° with respect to the ecliptic.

Physical characteristics 

Smuts has been characterized as a carbonaceous C-type asteroid.

Rotation period 

In March 2008, a rotational lightcurve of Smuts was obtained from photometric observations by French amateur astronomer René Roy. It gave a rotation period of 12.5 hours with a brightness variation of 0.8 magnitude.

Diameter and albedo 

According to the surveys carried out by the Japanese Akari satellite and NASA's Wide-field Infrared Survey Explorer with its subsequent NEOWISE mission, Smuts measures between 54.71 and 57.49 kilometers in diameter, and its surface has an albedo between 0.053 and 0.059. The Collaborative Asteroid Lightcurve Link derives an albedo of 0.0385 and a diameter of 53.83 kilometers based on an absolute magnitude of 10.5.

Naming 

This minor planet was named after prominent South African and British Commonwealth statesman, Field Marshal and philosopher, Jan Smuts (1870–1950), under whom the discoverer of the asteroid fought in both World Wars.

Smuts captured German South-West Africa in World War I and 0.0385 the only man to sign both of the peace treaties ending the First and Second World Wars. He served as prime minister of South Africa from 1919 until 1924 and again from 1939 until 1948. The official  was published by the Minor Planet Center on 20 February 1976.

References

External links 
 Asteroid Lightcurve Database (LCDB), query form (info )
 Dictionary of Minor Planet Names, Google books
 Asteroids and comets rotation curves, CdR – Observatoire de Genève, Raoul Behrend
 Discovery Circumstances: Numbered Minor Planets (1)-(5000)  – Minor Planet Center
 
 

001731
Discoveries by Ernest Leonard Johnson
Named minor planets
19480809